Stehøi or Stehøe is a mountain on the border of Luster Municipality in Vestland county and Lom Municipality in Innlandet county, Norway. The mountain is surrounded by several other notable mountains including Kyrkja and Kyrkjeoksli to the east, Høgvagltindene to the southeast, Surtningstinden and Gravdalstinden to the southwest, Smørstabbtindene and Stetinden to the northwest, and Tverrbottindene to the northeast.

See also
List of mountains of Norway by height

References

Jotunheimen
Lom, Norway
Luster, Norway
Mountains of Vestland
Mountains of Innlandet